The Sikorsky S-39 is an American light amphibious aircraft produced by Sikorsky Aircraft during the early 1930s. The S-39 was a smaller, single-engine version of the S-38.

Operational history

Spirit of Africa
Filmmakers Martin and Osa Johnson used a giraffe-patterned S-39 Spirit of Africa, with companion zebra-striped S-38 Osa's Ark, to explore Africa extensively, making safari movies and books.

Military usage

One example of the S-39 was acquired by the United States Army Air Corps in 1932, given the designation Y1C-28. It was evaluated for use in coastal patrol and light transport roles; in 1934 it was redesignated C-28 and assigned as a liaison aircraft to the United States Military Academy.

At least one S-39 saw service with the Civil Air Patrol Coastal Patrol from 1942 to 1943. This was part of a fleet of civilian aircraft flown by volunteers along the Atlantic and Gulf Coasts, searching for both German submarines and for allied ships in distress. Seaplanes such as the S-39 were sometimes used for search and rescue if another aircraft crashed or went missing. A surviving CAP S-39, previously based at Rehoboth Beach, Delaware, is currently on display at the New England Air Museum.

Yacht
Edward A. Deeds had the yacht Lotosland designed to incorporate aircraft capability. After loss of the planned aircraft on first loading Deeds ordered an S-39-A replacement the next day. The aircraft was intended to allow Deeds to quickly travel from his yacht to business and events ashore.

Variants
S-39-A 4-seat version
S-39-B Improved 5-seat version of the S-39-A
S-39-C Converted from S-39-B
C-28 One example of the S-39 acquired by the United States Army Air Corps

Surviving aircraft

 904 – S-39-B on static display at the New England Air Museum in Windsor Locks, Connecticut.
 Composite – S-39-C airworthy with at Fantasy of Flight in Polk City, Florida. It was recovered from Alaska in 1965 and incorporated parts of five S-39s. It was restored by Dick Jackson and first flew in 2003.
 920 – S-39-C under restoration with Frederick W. Patterson III of American Canyon, California. This is the last S-39 produced and was originally owned by Shell Eastern, the original name of the Shell Oil Company.

Specifications (S-39A)

References

External links

 Photos of the Sikorsky S-39
 Photos and story of the restored S-39 "Spirit of Igor"

S-039
1930s United States civil utility aircraft
Flying boats
Single-engined tractor aircraft
Parasol-wing aircraft
Aircraft first flown in 1929